Mykola Volodymyrovych Vechurko (born 6 July 1992) is a Ukrainian professional football midfielder who plays for AFSC Kyiv.

Career
Vechurko is a product of Youth Sportive School #15 Kyiv, where his first trainer was Ruslan Kanavskyi.

Before his debut for FC Arsenal on 20 July 2013, he spent four years for junior teams in the Ukrainian Premier Reserve League.

On 8 March 2017 Vechurko joined A Lyga club Utenis. Midfielder played in 15 out of 16 league games for the Lithuanian side, but was released by the club on 30 June 2017.

References

External links
 
 
 

1992 births
Living people
Ukrainian footballers
Footballers from Kyiv
FC Vorskla Poltava players
FC Arsenal Kyiv players
FC Hoverla Uzhhorod players
FC Hirnyk-Sport Horishni Plavni players
FC Ahal players
FC Ternopil players
FK Utenis Utena players
PFC Sumy players
AFSC Kyiv players
Ukrainian Premier League players
Ukrainian First League players
Ukrainian Second League players
A Lyga players
Ukrainian expatriate footballers
Expatriate footballers in Turkmenistan
Ukrainian expatriate sportspeople in Turkmenistan
Expatriate footballers in Lithuania
Ukrainian expatriate sportspeople in Lithuania
Association football midfielders
Ukraine youth international footballers